Sikanderpur is a town and a nagar panchayat in Kannauj district in the Indian state of Uttar Pradesh.

Geography

Demographics
, India census, Sikanderpur had a population of 7,564 Now it's 17586 . Males constitute 52% of the population and females 48%. Sikanderpur has an average literacy rate of 87%, higher than the national average of 59.5%: male literacy is 89%, and female literacy is 85%. In Sikanderpur, 16% of the population is under 6 years of age.

References

Cities and towns in Kannauj district